Vlahi (village) is a village in Kresna Municipality, in Blagoevgrad Province, Bulgaria.

Notable people
Yane Sandanski

References

Villages in Blagoevgrad Province